Fumarole Rising is the third studio album by Azalia Snail, released in 1994 by Funky Mushroom Records.

Track listing

Personnel 
Adapted from Fumarole Rising liner notes.

 Azalia Snail – vocals, guitar, keyboards, percussion, production, recording
Musicians
 John S. Hall – vocals (8)
 Susanne Lewis – violin (13)
 Andrew Nelson – drums, kalimba, percussion
 Nzomo – pocket trumpet and saxophone (1)
 Gary Olson – trumpet (4, 13)

Production and additional personnel
 Mike Burns – recording
 C. Running Sky – design
 Andrew Nelson – photography
 Carrie Schultz – art direction
 Greg Talenfeld – mixing, programming, recording (4), bass guitar (2)

Release history

References

External links 
 

1994 albums
Azalia Snail albums